Oscar Henry Manchester (14 April 1878 – 20 February 1958) was an Australian Rules footballer. He played 14 games for Carlton in the VFL between 1897 and 1898 and kicked three goals.

His debut match was the 1897 Round 7 clash with Collingwood.

References

Holmesby, Russell and Main, Jim (2011). The Encyclopedia of AFL Footballers. 9th ed. Melbourne: Bas Publishing.

External links

Carlton Football Club players
Australian rules footballers from Victoria (Australia)
1878 births
1958 deaths